William Dever may refer to:
 William Emmett Dever (1862–1929), mayor of Chicago 1923–1926
 William G. Dever, Syro-Palestinian archaeologist